Betsy Ross is a surviving 1917 American silent historical film starring Alice Brady and produced and distributed by her father William A. Brady.

Plot

As described in a film magazine, Betsy Griscome (Brady), against the wishes of her Quaker parents, keeps a tryst with a British officer, Clarence Vernon (Mayo), who promises to marry her upon his return. Clarissa (Cook), her sister, falls in love and marries Joseph Ashburn (Bowers), a trader. Suspecting Vernon of duplicity, Joseph and Vernon fight a duel and Vernon is struck down. A year later Betsy marries John Ross (Kennard), and upon his death she operates a little shop for a living. Here she shields her sister, who was driven from home when she could not produce her marriage certificate. Betsy is commissioned by General Washington (MacQuarrie) to make the first American flag and later is accused of harboring a spy - in reality, her sister's husband. The film ends happily when all relations are explained.

Cast
Alice Brady as Betsy Ross
John Bowers as Joseph Ashburn
Lillian Cook as Carissa Griscom
Victor Kennard as John Ross
Eugenie Woodward as Mrs. Ashburn
Kate Lester as Mrs. Vernon
Frank Mayo as Clarence Vernon
George MacQuarrie as George Washington
Justine Cutting as Mrs. Griscom
Robert Forsyth as Samuel Griscom
Nellie Fillmore as Mrs. Bass
Richard Clarke as Lemuel Ketch

Reception
Like many American films of the time, Betsy Ross was subject to cuts by city and state film censorship boards. The Chicago Board of Censors required cuts of scenes of a sword thrust during the duel, killing of second man in duel, the two intertitles "Scarlet woman" and "Don't you dare kill the Vernon nigger," the scene with a duel vision, and the actual firing of the squad at the execution.

References

Citations

Sources

External links

 
allmovie/synopsis: Betsy Ross
Lantern slide; Betsy Ross

1917 films
American silent feature films
American historical films
1910s historical films
American black-and-white films
World Film Company films
American Revolutionary War films
Films directed by Travers Vale
Betsy Ross
Articles containing video clips
Censored films
1910s American films
Cultural depictions of Betsy Ross